Paul Ollswang was an American underground cartoonist, writer, organizer, radio host, and musician, whose primary working years were spent in Eugene, Oregon.

Bibliography

Comics 
 Dreams of a Dog
 Doofer: Pathway to McEarth

Books 
 The Song of Tom O'Bedlam, 1977

Comic publications 
 Centrifugal Bumble-puppy
 Graphic Story Monthly
 The Comics Journal

Magazines and Newspapers 
 Oregon Cycling
 Comic News
 Willamette Valley Observer
 Rain Magazine

References 

1945 births
20th-century American artists
Alternative cartoonists
Underground artists
Underground cartoonists
Underground publishers
Artists from Eugene, Oregon
Living people